Crawford is an impact crater near Adelaide in South Australia, Australia.

The Crawford crater is up to 8.5 km long, and is thought to have been formed by oblique (low angle) impact. Its age is estimated to be greater than 35 million years (probably Eocene). Quartz rocks affected by impact-related pressure are present at the site, which is a flat area. The affected rocks are exposed at the surface.

References

Further reading 
 Haines, P. W., Therriault, A.M. and Kelley,S.P., Evidence for a mid-Cenozoic (?), low angle multiple impacts in south Australia. Meteoritics and Planetary Science, v.34, supplement, p. 49. 1999

Impact craters of South Australia
Eocene impact craters
Eocene Australia
Adelaide Hills